Roosevelt "Sandy" Gilliam Jr. (1932 – May 16, 2014) was an American football and baseball coach. He served as the head football coach at Maryland State College—now known as the University of Maryland Eastern Shore—from 1964 to 1968.  Gilliam was a scout for the Denver Broncos of the American Football League (AFL) and National Football League (NFL) from 1969 to 1973.

Head coaching record

College football

References

1932 births
2014 deaths
American football quarterbacks
Allen Yellow Jackets football players
Denver Broncos scouts
Maryland Eastern Shore Hawks athletic directors
Maryland Eastern Shore Hawks baseball coaches
Maryland Eastern Shore Hawks football coaches
High school basketball coaches in the United States
High school football coaches in South Carolina
People from Union, South Carolina
Coaches of American football from South Carolina
Players of American football from South Carolina
African-American coaches of American football
African-American players of American football
20th-century African-American sportspeople
21st-century African-American sportspeople